Henry Irvine Bird (1892– 8 November 1971) was a Canadian lawyer and judge. He was Chief Justice of British Columbia from 1964 to 1967.

References 

1892 births
1971 deaths
Lawyers in British Columbia
Judges in British Columbia
People from Coburg
Upper Canada College alumni
Osgoode Hall Law School alumni
Canadian Expeditionary Force soldiers
Canadian Expeditionary Force officers